Grzegorz Motyka (born 31 January 1972) is a former footballer who played as a defender or midfielder. In a career which was mostly played in the top two divisions in Poland, he had spells with Hutnik Nowa Huta, Amica Wronki, and Dyskobolia Grodzisk Wielkopolski. His longest spell at a club was with Lechia Gdańsk, where also played in both of the Lechia Gdańsk merger teams Olimpia-Lechia Gdańsk and Lechia-Polonia Gdańsk.

Football

Lechia Gdańsk
Born in Gdańsk, Motyka started playing football for local team Lechia Gdańsk alongside his brother Tomasz Motyka. He made his first team debut against Widzew Łódź towards the end of the 1990–91 season. At the start of his career Motyka played mainly as a defender for Lechia, before advancing slightly higher up the pitch to play as a defensive midfielder. During his time with Lechia the team played in the II liga, the second division in Poland. At the end of the 1994–95 season Lechia were relegated to the third tier. In total for Lechia Gdańsk, Motyka played 80 games and scored 3 goals.

Olimpia-Lechia Gdańsk

With Lechia Gdańsk being relegated to the third division, a merger was formed with Olimpia Poznań to create the Olimpia-Lechia Gdańsk team taking Olimpia's position in the top division. Motyka moved from the relegated Lechia team to the newly formed Olimpia-Lechia team. In total Motyka played twenty times in his first top division season, scoring one goal as the Olimpia-Lechia suffered with relegation. At the end of the season the team was dissolved, with Motyka finding himself without a club.

Hutnik Nowa Huta

Motyka moved to Kraków joining Hutnik Nowa Huta to stay in the top division. For Hutnik he played 29 times during the 1996–97 season. Motyka suffered the same fate as 12 months prior, as Hutnik found themselves being relegated from the I liga.

Amica Wronki

The next club Motyka joined was Amica Wronki. The two years he spent at Amica ended up being the most successful of his career. In his first season at the club, Amica won the Polish Cup. His second season was more successful with Amica winning both the Polish SuperCup and the Polish Cup for the second time. In total he played 43 league games for Amica over the two seasons.

Dyskobolia Grodzisk Wielkopolski

Motyka joined Dyskobolia in the summer of 1999 and had a short spell with the club leaving in the next transfer window despite playing in most of Dyskobolia's games up to that point in the season.

Lechia-Polonia Gdańsk

In January 2000 he moved back to Gdańsk having dropped down a division to play with Lechia-Polonia Gdańsk. He played most of the remaining games of the season for Lechia, helping the club to avoid relegation.

Later years

Motyka joined fellow II liga team KSZO Ostrowiec Świętokrzyski in 2000, but managed to only play in 4 games in all competitions as the team won promotion to the I liga. He spent two seasons with Aluminium Konin, helping the team to win promotion from the third tier to the second. In 2002 he moved back to the Pomeranian region of Poland, playing with KP Sopot, Unia Tczew, Przylesie Sopot and GKS Kowale, retiring from football in 2009.

Honours

Amica Wronki
Polish Cup: 1997–98, 1998–99
Polish SuperCup: 1998

References

1972 births
Living people
Sportspeople from Gdańsk
Sportspeople from Pomeranian Voivodeship
Lechia Gdańsk players
Hutnik Nowa Huta players
Amica Wronki players
Dyskobolia Grodzisk Wielkopolski players
KSZO Ostrowiec Świętokrzyski players
Górnik Konin players
Unia Tczew players
Polish footballers
Association football defenders
Association football midfielders